Francisco Henríquez de Zubiría (Paris, 1869 – 1933) was a French-born Colombian who represented France at the 1900 Summer Olympics in the tug of war team competition; they won a silver medal. 

The son of Ricardo Carlos Henríquez and Maria Ana Antonia Clemencia de Zubiría y Osse, he was a Colombian citizen until he was naturalized as a Frenchman in 1917. He studied medicine and worked at the Colombian embassy in Paris, also serving as a doctor during World War I for the French Army.

References

External link

1869 births
1933 deaths
Sportspeople from Paris
Tug of war competitors at the 1900 Summer Olympics
Olympic tug of war competitors of France
Olympic silver medalists for France
Olympic medalists in tug of war
Medalists at the 1900 Summer Olympics
French people of Colombian descent